Lucas de Clercq (1603 – 1652), was a Dutch cloth merchant known today for his and his wife's pendant marriage portraits painted by Frans Hals.

Biography
He was born in Haarlem as the son of a wealthy Mennonite family from Rumbeeke. He became a merchant who dealt in potash, an ingredient used in the Haarlem bleaching industry for linens and linen yarn. He married the daughter of his supplier, Feyntje Steenkiste and nine years after they married, Hals won the commission for their portraits. In 1638 they moved to a large house at the corner of the Berckenrodesteeg and the Spaarne street, near the central weigh house. De Clercq also owned the estate "Clercq & Beeck" in Overveen. Feyntje died in 1640 and De Clercq remarried Adriaentgen Keyser in 1645. A painting by Dirck Bleker of the two of them with their children from their first marriages is in the collection of the Amsterdam Museum. Both the portrait of Lucas de Clercq and his wife Feyntje or Feyna remained in the De Clercq family for several generations, and were hanging in their buitenplaats called "Vredelust aan 't Geyn" in 1885. These portraits are among the earliest acquisitions of the Rijksmuseum.

References

Lucas de Clercq on Getty Center website
Portrait of Lucas with his second wife in the Amsterdam Museum

1603 births
1652 deaths
People from Haarlem
Businesspeople from Haarlem
Dutch merchants